Yael Goldstein Love (born 1978) is a novelist, editor and book critic. She is also co-founder and editorial director of the literary studio Plympton.

Biography 
Goldstein Love's first novel was The Passion of Tasha Darsky, originally titled Overture (Doubleday, 2007), about the contentious relationship between mother and daughter musicians. Her mother is the novelist and philosopher Rebecca Goldstein, which caused speculation about whether the novel was autobiographical. In response, Goldstein Love said, "my mother's relationship with me is nothing like this. First of all, Tasha is nothing like my mother. She's this incredibly ambitious, incredibly driven woman. My mother's ambitious, but not like that."

Goldstein Love graduated from Harvard College with a degree in philosophy. Her father is the mathematical physicist Sheldon Goldstein. Her stepfather is Steven Pinker, the linguist and evolutionary psychologist.

In 2011, Goldstein Love and fellow writer Jennifer 8. Lee founded a literary studio named Plympton, Inc.   The studio focuses on publishing serialized fiction for digital platforms.   Its first series launched in September 2012 as part of the Kindle Serials program. It also launched the app Rooster, a mobile reading service for iOS7, in March 2014.

References 

1978 births
Living people
Jewish American novelists
Harvard College alumni
Place of birth missing (living people)
American women novelists
American literary critics
American women literary critics
21st-century American novelists
21st-century American Jews
21st-century American women